On the 25th of September, 2011, Buddha Air Flight 103, a Beechcraft 1900D commuter aircraft, crashed near Lalitpur, Nepal, while attempting to land in poor weather at nearby Kathmandu Airport. All 19 passengers and crew on board were killed. The aircraft, operated by Buddha Air, was on a sightseeing flight to Mount Everest.

Aircraft
The aircraft was a 19-seat Beechcraft 1900D twin-engine turboprop airliner; it was thirteen years old and registered in Nepal as 9N-AEK. Initial investigations revealed that the aircraft was being operated under VFR (Visual Flight Rules); and two minutes before it was due to land it entered clouds and crashed at 5400 feet. Air traffic controllers and members of the investigation team claim the reason for the crash was pilot error.

Passengers
The sixteen passengers included ten Indian nationals, one Japanese, two Americans and three Nepalese.

References

External links
 
 Buddha Air

Aviation accidents and incidents in 2011
Accidents and incidents involving the Beechcraft 1900
Aviation accidents and incidents in Nepal
2011 in Nepal
September 2011 events in Asia
2011 disasters in Nepal